Santa Cruz is a Chilean city and commune, located in the Colchagua valley, in the O'Higgins Region, located on the southern shore of the Tinguiririca river, 110 miles from Santiago, Chile's capital city, and 27 miles from San Fernando.

History
There is no exact data about the founding of the city, although there is an official date when the city became a municipality in the year 1891, the same year that Pichilemu did.

From its beginnings, the town was a center of handcrafted artifacts and agricultural development, with wheat, tomatoes, and wine being the main products of the area.  Because of the relation with countryside traditions from its beginning, Santa Cruz offers an authentic look at the rural traditions of Chilean culture expressed in the wine, the food, and the traditional sports such as the rodeo.

The city of Santa Cruz was among those affected by the 2010 Chile earthquake.

Demographics
Of these, 18,603 (57.4%) lived in urban areas and 13,784 (42.6%) in rural areas. The population grew by 10.7% (3,129 persons) between the 1992 and 2002 censuses.

Tourist attractions
Santa Cruz has very well preserved colonial architecture.  The most famous tourist attractions of the city are located in the Plaza de Armas.  These include the historic Santa Cruz church, Santa Cruz Hotel, and Carillon Clock, the latter of which was constructed by order of mayor Carlos Cardoen Decoene in 1970, and which is used today as an interactive tourist information center.  Other noteworthy attractions include the Museum of Colchagua, the Casino of Colchagua, and the Wine Train vineyard tour.

Economy
In the last two decades, rural tourism has become an important source of revenue for the city.  The development of this industry was due especially because of the vineyards placed in the valley joint in a project called "Wine Route", that offers several tours in the area

Climate
Temperate warm climate, with rains between June and November.

Administration
As a commune, Santa Cruz is a third-level administrative division of Chile administered by a municipal council, headed by an alcalde, who is directly elected every four years.  The 2021-2024 alcalde is William Arévalo.

Towns and villages 
 

Isla de Yáquil
Paniahue

See also 
Neighbourhoods in Santa Cruz, Chile
Liceo Santa Cruz
Carlos Cardoen
Deportes Santa Cruz

References

External links 

  Municipality of Santa Cruz

Communes of Chile
Populated places in Colchagua Province